The 2015/16 NTFL season was the 95th season of the Northern Territory Football League (NTFL).

St Marys have won there 31st premiership title while defeating Wanderers Eagles in the grand final by 2 points.

Ladder

Grand Final

References

Northern Territory Football League seasons
NTFL